is a range of volcanic mountains in central Izu Peninsula in Shizuoka Prefecture, Japan, forming the border between Izu City and Higashi-Izu Town.

There are several hiking routes to the top. Flora in the area include rhododendrons, Japanese andromeda, stewartia monadelpha and Siebold's beech.

Many ships of the Imperial Japanese Navy were named after it, including a corvette, a battlecruiser and an aircraft carrier.

Amagi is listed as one of the 100 Famous Japanese Mountains in a book composed in 1964 by mountaineer/author Kyūya Fukada.

Gallery

References

External links

 Amagi San - Geological Survey of Japan
 Tourist brochure - Izu city official
 Hiking Map - Izu city official  (web.archive.org)

Amagi
Fuji-Hakone-Izu National Park
Amagi
Volcanoes of Honshū